St John's Shopping Centre is a shopping mall in Perth, Scotland. Situated between (and with entrances from) South Street (to the south), King Edward Street (to the east), Scott Street (to the west) and the pedestrianised section of the High Street (to the north), it was built between 1985 and 1987. It cost around £20 million. Its main entrance is that facing the Category B listed Perth City Hall on King Edward Street, with Perth mercat cross standing between the two.

Its construction meant the ancient St John's Square was demolished, with its residents relocated elsewhere in the city.

The shopping centre was opened in March 1988 by Dr Willi Reiland, mayor for thirty years of Perth's twin town, Aschaffenburg, Germany.

The centre was once owned by Gerald Grosvenor, 6th Duke of Westminster. It was purchased by the Universities Superannuation Scheme from BAE Systems Pension Funds in 2011.

Clock
When renovations were undertaken in 1997, the shopping centre's astronomical clock, which was part of the building at its 1988 opening and was a feature for many years thereafter, was moved to Perth Leisure Pool, where it was visible only from the top of the flume tower. It stopped working the following year, and was moved into storage. In 2019, there was a movement to bring the clock back. It features two characters who appear on the hour mark and tell the story of Sir Walter Scott's The Fair Maid of Perth.

Stores
, St John's Shopping Centre contains 28 stores:

BB's Coffee & Muffins
Bonmarché
Café Central
Card Factory
CeX
Claire's Accessories
Clintons
Ernest Jones
Fone Care
GAME
H. Samuel
JD Sports
Ladbrokes
M&Co.

M1 Clothing
O2
Poundland
Primark
River Island
The Best in Leather
The Perfume Shop
The Works
Three
Timpson
Trespass
TSB
Virgin Money
Waterstones

References

External links

Shopping centres in Scotland
Buildings and structures in Perth, Scotland
1988 establishments in Scotland
Clocks in the United Kingdom